Aethionema retsina is a species of flowering plant in the family Brassicaceae. It is found only in Greece. Its natural habitats are Mediterranean-type shrubby vegetation and rocky shores. It is threatened by habitat loss.

References

retsina
Flora of Greece
Critically endangered plants
Taxonomy articles created by Polbot